Louise Grimm Hansen (born 12 June 1990) is a Danish female badminton player.

Achievements

BWF International Challenge/Series
Women's doubles

Mixed doubles

 BWF International Challenge tournament
 BWF International Series tournament
 BWF Future Series tournament

References

External links
 
 

1990 births
Living people
Danish female badminton players
21st-century Danish women